In enzymology, a homocitrate synthase is an enzyme that catalyzes the chemical reaction

acetyl-CoA + H2O + 2-oxoglutarate  (R)-2-hydroxybutane-1,2,4-tricarboxylate + CoA

The 3 substrates of this enzyme are acetyl-CoA, H2O, and 2-oxoglutarate, whereas its two products are (R)-2-hydroxybutane-1,2,4-tricarboxylate and CoA.

This enzyme belongs to the family of transferases, specifically those acyltransferases that convert acyl groups into alkyl groups on transfer.  The systematic name of this enzyme class is acetyl-CoA:2-oxoglutarate C-acetyltransferase (thioester-hydrolysing, carboxymethyl forming). Other names in common use include 2-hydroxybutane-1,2,4-tricarboxylate 2-oxoglutarate-lyase, (CoA-acetylating), acetyl-coenzyme A:2-ketoglutarate C-acetyl transferase, and homocitrate synthetase.  This enzyme participates in lysine biosynthesis and pyruvate metabolism.

References

 
 
 

EC 2.3.3
Enzymes of unknown structure